Barfi Laddu is a 2019 Pakistani romantic comedy series produced by Abdullah Seja under Idream Entertainment. It has Ali Safina and Sumbul Iqbal in lead role while Irsa Ghazal, Uroosa Siddiqui, Shaheen Khan, Nayyar Ejaz, Zaheen Tahira, Ismail Tara, Behroze Sabzwari, and Saleem Mairaj in pivot roles. It aired every Thursday nights on ARY Digital. The serial marks the last on-screen appearance of veteran actress Zaheen Tahira.

Cast
Ali Safina as Laddu
Sumbul Iqbal as Barfi
Irsa Ghazal as Naila Sheikh; Laddu's mother
Uroosa Siddiqui as Titli
Shaheen Khan as Bibi Sheerini
Nayyar Ejaz as Iqbal Halwai
Zaheen Tahira as Iqbal's Mother
Gul-e-Rana as Khala Khateera
Behroze Sabzwari as Laddu's father
Afshan Qureshi as Khala Qudsia
Ismail Tara
Saleem Mairaj

References

External links
Official website

2019 Pakistani television series debuts
Pakistani romance television series
Pakistani comedy television series
Urdu-language television shows
ARY Digital original programming